Neville Leopold Bonitto (15 August 1924 – 14 January 2013) was a cricketer who played first-class cricket for Jamaica from 1947 to 1957.

Neville Bonitto was a middle-order batsman who made his highest score of 207 not out against British Guiana in 1952-53, when he added 283 for the fifth wicket with Alfie Binns. He migrated to the United States in the 1950s.

References

External links

 

1924 births
2013 deaths
Sportspeople from Kingston, Jamaica
Jamaica cricketers
Jamaican cricketers
Emigrants from British Jamaica to the United States